The Keisei Hai (Japanese 京成杯) is a Grade 3 horse race for three-year-old Thoroughbreds run in January over a distance of 2000 metres at Nakayama Racecourse.

The race was first run in 1961 and has been run as a Grade 3 level since 1984. The race was originally run over 1600 metres before the distance was extended to 2000 metres in 1999.

Winners since 2000

Earlier winners

 1984 - Hatsuno Amoy
 1985 - Sakura Sunny O
 1986 - Dyna Fairy
 1987 - Super Phantom
 1988 - Tosho Mario
 1989 - Speak Reason
 1990 - No More Speedy
 1991 - Dynamite Daddy
 1992 - A P Jet
 1993 - Osumi Point
 1994 - Biko Pegasus
 1995 - Mighty Force
 1996 - Sakura Speed O
 1997 - Speed World
 1998 - Mandarin Star
 1999 - Osumi Bright

See also
 Horse racing in Japan
 List of Japanese flat horse races

References

Turf races in Japan